"Willow Wall", also known as McNeill Family House, is a historic home located near Old Fields, Hardy County, West Virginia. It was built in 1811–1812, and is a two-story, "U"-shaped brick dwelling in the Georgian-Tidewater style. It has a double Georgian porch, outlined by Ionic order columns. The two wings have double Palladian windows on the front gable ends. The interior features the French hand-printed wallpaper "The Passing of the Chase."  The property was first settled in between 1760 and 1770 by Daniel McNeill. During the American Civil War the McNeill properties were centers of activity for McNeill's Rangers and the Willow Wall residence was used as a hospital for wounded men.

The Battle of Moorefield of August 7, 1864 (also styled the Battle of Old Fields) began outside Willow Wall. It followed Jubal Early's Confederate raid upon Washington, and his cavalry under McCauseland and Johnson's ensuing burning of Chambersburg, PA. General Johnson was staying in a second-floor room of Willow Wall, and he escaped out a window. The Confederate losses suffered in the battle left them unable to control the Shenandoah Valley and marked the increasing Union dominance in the Valley.

There is a tale that Daniel McNeill (who died 1844 and is buried in a tomb across the road and about 50 yds. to the south) owned many slaves, and was somewhat of a cruel man. Becoming aggrieved that someone was pilfering from him, as an object lesson he had one of his slave's hands cut off, and kept in a jar on a shelf in the basement house-slave quarters. At least until the late 1970s, there was a portrait of Daniel McNeill present in the 2nd floor hallway as an old man, lying in bed with severely twisted and crippled hands.

Willow Wall has strong architectural and historical connections to four nearby Van Meter family dwellings: Buena Vista Farms, Traveler's Rest, Fort Pleasant, and the Garrett VanMeter House.

Willow Wall was listed on the National Register of Historic Places in 1973.

References

External links

American Civil War sites in West Virginia
Georgian architecture in West Virginia
Hardy County, West Virginia in the American Civil War
Houses completed in 1812
Houses in Hardy County, West Virginia
Houses on the National Register of Historic Places in West Virginia
National Register of Historic Places in Hardy County, West Virginia
Historic American Buildings Survey in West Virginia
Palladian Revival architecture in West Virginia
1812 establishments in Virginia